Oiva Tylli (21 February 1914 – 16 June 1975) was a Finnish sports shooter. He competed in the 50 m pistol event at the 1952 Summer Olympics.

References

External links
 

1914 births
1975 deaths
Finnish male sport shooters
Olympic shooters of Finland
Shooters at the 1952 Summer Olympics
People from Virolahti
Sportspeople from Kymenlaakso